1997 was the sixth season Russia held its own national football competition since the breakup of the Soviet Union.

Club competitions
FC Spartak Moscow won the title for the fifth time. This was the last season fourth tier of the Russian football was a professional Russian Third League.

For more details, see:
1997 Russian Top League
1997 Russian First League
1997 Russian Second League
1997 Russian Third League

Cup competitions
The fifth edition of the Russian Cup, 1996–97 Russian Cup was won by FC Lokomotiv Moscow, who beat FC Dynamo Moscow in the finals with a score of 2–0.

Early stages of the 1997–98 Russian Cup were played later in the year.

European club competitions

1996–97 UEFA Champions League, 1996–97 UEFA Cup Winners' Cup, 1996–97 UEFA Cup
Russian teams were eliminated in 1996.

1997–98 UEFA Champions League
FC Spartak Moscow were eliminated in the second qualifying round and went on to the UEFA Cup.

 August 13, 1997 / Second qualifying round, First leg / 1. FC Košice – FC Spartak Moscow 2-1 (Kožlej  Kozák  – Dmitriev ) / Košice, Lokomotíva Stadium / Attendance: 12,600
FC Spartak Moscow: Filimonov, Gorlukovich, Khlestov, Tsymbalar (captain), Mamedov (Evseev, 77), Ananko, Bakharev (Melyoshin, 45), Alenichev, Titov, Dmitriev (Robson, 81), Tikhonov.

 August 27, 1997 / Second qualifying round, Return leg / FC Spartak Moscow – 1. FC Košice 0-0 / Moscow, Lokomotiv Stadium / Attendance: 20,000
FC Spartak Moscow: Filimonov, Gorlukovich, Khlestov, Tsymbalar (captain), Ananko (Golovskoy, 46), Evseev, Robson (Lutovinov, 75), Alenichev, Titov, Dmitriev (Kechinov, 32), Tikhonov.

1997–98 UEFA Cup Winners' Cup

FC Lokomotiv Moscow qualified for the quarterfinals stage that was played in 1998.

 September 18, 1997 / First round, first leg / Belshina Bobruisk – FC Lokomotiv Moscow (Hlebasolaw  – Loskov  Borodyuk ) / Minsk, Dinamo Stadium / Attendance: 4,000
FC Lokomotiv Moscow: Podshivalov, Solomatin, Drozdov, Kharlachyov, Arifullin, Chugainov (captain), Smirnov, Borodyuk, Janashia (Bulykin, 79), Loskov, Cherevchenko.

 October 2, 1997 / First round, return leg / FC Lokomotiv Moscow – FC Belshina Bobruisk 3–0 (Maminov  Kharlachyov  Loskov ) / Moscow, Lokomotiv Stadium / Attendance: 1,500
FC Lokomotiv Moscow: Bidzhiyev, Solomatin, Drozdov, Kharlachyov, Arifullin, Chugainov (captain), Smirnov (Sarkisyan, 64), Cherevchenko (Pashinin, 75), Janashia (Veselov, 69), Loskov, Maminov.

 October 23, 1997 / Second round, first leg / FC Lokomotiv Moscow – Kocaelispor 2–1 (Kharlachyov  Janashia  – Turan ) / Moscow, Lokomotiv Stadium / Attendance: 3,500
FC Lokomotiv Moscow: Bidzhiyev, Solomatin, Drozdov (Pashinin, 89), Kharlachyov, Cherevchenko, Chugainov (captain), Maminov (Sarkisyan, 81), Gurenko, Janashia, Loskov, Veselov (Smirnov, 46).

 November 6, 1997 / Second round, return leg / Kocaelispor – FC Lokomotiv Moscow 0–0 / İzmit, Ismet Pasa Stadium / Attendance: 15,000.
FC Lokomotiv Moscow: Bidzhiyev, Solomatin, Drozdov, Kharlachyov, Arifullin, Chugainov (captain), Smirnov (Sarkisyan, 82), Gurenko, Pashinin, Loskov, Veselov (Maminov, 73).

1997–98 UEFA Cup
FC Spartak Moscow qualified for the quarterfinals stage that was played in 1998. FC Rotor Volgograd reached the second round. FC Alania Vladikavkaz went out in the first round.

 August 12, 1997 / Second qualifying round, First leg / FC Alania Vladikavkaz – FC Dnipro Dnipropetrovsk 2-1 (Žutautas  Ashvetia  – Palyanytsya ) / Vladikavkaz, Republican Spartak Stadium / Attendance: 32,000
FC Alania Vladikavkaz: Kramarenko, Pagayev, Timofeev, Žutautas, Agayev (Ashvetia, 32), Tsveiba, Tedeyev (captain), Dzhioyev, Yanovskiy, Kobiashvili, Kanishchev, Gakhokidze.
 August 12, 1997 / Second qualifying round, First leg / FC Rotor Volgograd – Odra Wodzisław 2-0 (Niederhaus  Veretennikov ) / Volgograd, Central Stadium / Attendance: 25,000
FC Rotor Volgograd: Zakharchuk, Shmarko, Gerashchenko (captain) (Olenikov, 46), Tishchenko (Krivov, 27), Berketov, Borzenkov, Zubko (Niederhaus, 52), Zernov, Veretennikov, Yesipov, Abramov.

 August 26, 1997 / Second qualifying round, Return leg / FC Dnipro Dnipropetrovsk – FC Alania Vladikavkaz 1-4 (Sharan  – Gakhokidze   Yanovskiy  Kobiashvili ) / Dnipropetrovsk, Stadium Meteor / Attendance: 8,000
FC Alania Vladikavkaz: Khapov, Pagayev, Avdeev (Agayev, 64), Tskhadadze, Dzhioyev (captain) (Kornienko, 75), Tsveiba, Žutautas, Yanovskiy, Kobiashvili (Datdeyev, 84), Kanishchev, Gakhokidze.
 August 26, 1997 / Second qualifying round, Return leg / Odra Wodzisław – FC Rotor Volgograd (Staniek  Zagórski  Brzoza  – Berketov  Abramov   Veretennikov  ) / Wodzisław Śląski, MOSiR Stadium / Attendance: 8,000
FC Rotor Volgograd: Zakharchuk, Shmarko, Veretennikov, Niederhaus (Burlachenko, 46), Yesipov, Borzenkov, Gerashchenko (captain), Zubko (Zernov, 46), Berketov, Abramov, Olenikov (Krivov, 75).

 September 16, 1997 / First round, First leg / MTK Hungária FC – FC Alania Vladikavkaz 3-0 (Illés  Preisinger  Lörincz  – Pagayev ) / Budapest, Hidegkuti Nándor Stadium / Attendance: 3,000
FC Alania Vladikavkaz: Khapov, Pagayev, Avdeev (Datdeyev, 57), Kornienko, Dzhioyev (captain), Tsveiba, Žutautas, Yanovskiy, Kobiashvili, Kanishchev (Ashvetia, 76), Gakhokidze.
 September 16, 1997 / First round, First leg / FC Rotor Volgograd – Örebro SK 2-0 (Berketov  Veretennikov ) / Volgograd, Central Stadium / Attendance: 23,000
FC Rotor Volgograd: Zakharchuk, Shmarko, Veretennikov, Zubko (Tishchenko, 64), Yesipov (Krivov, 81), Borzenkov, Gerashchenko (captain), Burlachenko, Berketov, Zhunenko (Zernov, 46), Olenikov.
 September 16, 1997 / First round, First leg / FC Sion – FC Spartak Moscow 0-1 (Kechinov  Khlestov ) / Sion, Stade Tourbillon / Attendance: 6,000
FC Spartak Moscow: Filimonov, Gorlukovich (captain), Khlestov, Golovskoy, Ananko, Lutovinov (Buznikin, 66), Robson (Konovalov, 59), Alenichev, Bakharev, Kechinov (Shirko, 75), Tikhonov.

 September 30, 1997 / First round, Return leg / FC Alania Vladikavkaz – MTK Hungária FC 1-1 (Moroz  – Halmai ) / Vladikavkaz, Republican Spartak Stadium / Attendance: 31,000
FC Alania Vladikavkaz: Khapov, Gakhokidze, Avdeev (Bazayev, 75), Kornienko, Dzhioyev (captain), Moroz, Žutautas, Yanovskiy, Datdeyev (Agayev, 46), Kanishchev, Ashvetia (Sikoyev, 55).
 September 30, 1997 / First round, Return leg / Örebro SK – FC Rotor Volgograd 1-4 (E. Karlsson  – Niederhaus   Zernov  Veretennikov ) / Örebro, Eyravallen / Attendance: 8,000
FC Rotor Volgograd: Zakharchuk, Shmarko, Veretennikov, Niederhaus (Mysin, 78), Smirnov, Zernov (Zubko, 68), Gerashchenko (captain), Burlachenko, Berketov, Abramov, Olenikov (Matiola, 80).
 September 30, 1997 / First round, Return leg / FC Spartak Moscow – FC Sion 2-2 (Shirko  Alenichev  – Lota  ) / Moscow, Lokomotiv Stadium / Attendance: 12,000
FC Spartak Moscow: Filimonov, Gorlukovich (captain), Ananko, Golovskoy, Romaschenko, Shirko, Buznikin (Robson, 68), Alenichev, Titov, Kechinov, Tikhonov.

The goal in the stadium was measured before the game and turned out to be 2.46 meters high instead of regulation 2.44. The referee decided to play the game anyway. After FC Sion's protest, UEFA decided to replay the return leg.

 October 15, 1997 / First round, Return leg / FC Spartak Moscow – FC Sion 5-1 (Buznikin  Titov  Kechinov  Tikhonov  Romaschenko  – Camadini ) / Moscow, Lokomotiv Stadium / Attendance: 24,000
FC Spartak Moscow: Filimonov, Gorlukovich (captain), Ananko (Golovskoy, 84), Evseev, Romaschenko, Shirko (Tsymbalar, 46), Buznikin (Melyoshin, 65), Alenichev, Titov, Kechinov, Tikhonov.

 October 21, 1997 / Second round, First leg / FC Rotor Volgograd – S.S. Lazio 0-0 / Volgograd, Central Stadium / Attendance: 25,000
FC Rotor Volgograd: Zakharchuk, Shmarko, Veretennikov, Niederhaus, Yesipov, Zernov (Zubko, 76), Gerashchenko (captain), Burlachenko (Krivov, 63), Berketov, Abramov (Zhunenko, 81), Olenikov.
 October 21, 1997 / Second round, First leg / FC Spartak Moscow – Real Valladolid 2-0 (Tikhonov  Titov ) / Moscow, Lokomotiv Stadium / Attendance: 10,000
FC Spartak Moscow: Filimonov, Gorlukovich (captain), Golovskoy, Evseev, Romaschenko, Shirko (Lutovinov, 54), Buznikin (Bakharev, 61), Alenichev, Titov, Kechinov, Tikhonov.

 November 4, 1997 / Second round, Return leg / S.S. Lazio – FC Rotor Volgograd 3-0 (Casiraghi  Mancini  Signori ) / Rome, Stadio Olimpico / Attendance: 40,000
FC Rotor Volgograd: Zakharchuk, Shmarko, Veretennikov (captain), Niederhaus, Yesipov, Zernov (Zubko, 46), Krivov (Burlachenko, 67), Abramov, Berketov, Zhunenko, Olenikov.
 November 4, 1997 / Real Valladolid – FC Spartak Moscow 1-2 (Juan Carlos  – Shirko  ) / Valladolid, Estadio José Zorrilla / Attendance: 16,700
FC Spartak Moscow: Filimonov, Gorlukovich (captain), Ananko, Evseev, Romaschenko, Shirko, Robson (Bakharev, 46), Alenichev, Titov (Lutovinov, 79), Kechinov (Melyoshin, 68), Tikhonov.

 November 25, 1997 / Third round, First leg / Karlsruher SC – FC Spartak Moscow 0-0 (Golovskoy  / Karlsruhe, Wildparkstadion / Attendance: 15,000
FC Spartak Moscow: Filimonov, Gorlukovich (captain), Ananko, Evseev, Romaschenko, Shirko, Bakharev (Melyoshin, 45), Golovskoy, Titov, Kechinov, Tikhonov.

 December 9, 1997 / Third round, Return leg / FC Spartak Moscow – Karlsruher SC 1-0  (Shirko ) / Moscow, Lokomotiv Stadium / Attendance: 10,000
FC Spartak Moscow: Filimonov, Gorlukovich (captain), Ananko, Khlestov, Romaschenko, Shirko, Buznikin (Robson, 46), Alenichev, Titov, Kechinov (Melyoshin, 22), Tikhonov.

1997 UEFA Intertoto Cup
FC Dynamo Moscow, FC Torpedo-Luzhniki Moscow and FC Lokomotiv Nizhny Novgorod all won their groups, but were knocked out in the semi-finals.

 June 22, 1997 / Group 12, Day 1 / FC Merani-91 Tbilisi – FC Torpedo-Luzhniki Moscow 0-2 (Gashkin  Mashkarin ) / Tbilisi, Boris Paichadze Stadium / Attendance: 20,000
FC Torpedo-Luzhniki Moscow: Vorobyov, Kornaukhov (Arlowski, 46), Khokhlov, Mashkarin (captain), Makhmutov (Burchenkov, 46), Bushmanov, Avakov (Jankauskas, 71), Kamoltsev, Gashkin, Ražanauskas, Preikšaitis.

 June 28, 1997 / Group 11, Day 2 / FC Lokomotiv Nizhny Novgorod – FK Proleter Zrenjanin 1-0 (Bystrov ) / Nizhny Novgorod, Lokomotiv Stadium / Attendance: 10,860
FC Lokomotiv Nizhny Novgorod: Satsunkevich, Baltušnikas, Nizhegorodov, Kurayev, Lipko, Kazakov (captain) (Kashentsev, 36), Bystrov, Zubkov, Rapeika, Durnev (Chudin, 54; Perednya, 75), Mukhamadiev.
 June 29, 1997 / Group 5, Day 2 / FC Dynamo Moscow – Panachaiki 2–1 (Shtanyuk , Kutsenko  – Klejch ) / Moscow, Dynamo Stadium / Attendance: 3,500
FC Dynamo Moscow: Tiapushkin, Tochilin (Zharinov, 68), Kovtun, Ostrovskiy (Korablyov, 75), Shtanyuk, Kulchiy, Grishin, Skokov (Gusev, 78), Kutsenko, Nekrasov, Teryokhin.

 July 5, 1997 / Group 5, Day 3 / B36 Tórshavn – FC Dynamo Moscow 0–1 (Ostrovskiy ) / Toftir, Svangaskarð / Attendance: 500
FC Dynamo Moscow: Tiapushkin, Tochilin, Kovtun, Ostrovskiy, Shtanyuk, Kulchiy, Grishin (Tishkov, 7), Skokov, Kutsenko, Nekrasov, Gusev (Kulyov, 57).
 July 5, 1997 / Group 11, Day 3 / Publikum – FC Lokomotiv Nizhny Novgorod 1-2 (Sivko  – Duyun  Ionanidze ) / Celje, Skalna Klet / Attendance: 2,000
FC Lokomotiv Nizhny Novgorod: Satsunkevich, Baltušnikas, Nizhegorodov (Kashentsev, 65), Kurayev (captain), Lipko, Ionanidze, Bystrov, Zubkov (Duyun, 50), Rapeika, Durnev, Mukhamadiev (Dzhubanov, 60).
 July 5, 1997 / Group 12, Day 3 / FC Torpedo-Luzhniki Moscow – Iraklis Thessaloniki F.C. 4-1 (Jankauskas  Kamoltsev  Khokhlov  Preikšaitis  – Hantzidis ) / Moscow, Torpedo Stadium / Attendance: 2,500
FC Torpedo-Luzhniki Moscow: Vorobyov, Arlowski, Khokhlov, Mashkarin (captain), Eguavoen, Bushmanov, Ražanauskas (Kamoltsev, 46), Preikšaitis, Burchenkov (Gashkin, 65), Jankauskas, Carlos Alberto (Makhmutov, 73).

 July 12, 1997 / Group 5, Day 4 / FC Dynamo Moscow – Racing Genk 3–2 (Teryokhin  Kulchiy  Korablyov  – Oularé  Keita ) / Moscow, Dynamo Stadium / Attendance: 3,000
FC Dynamo Moscow: Tiapushkin, Tochilin (Gusev, 38), Kovtun, Ostrovskiy, Korablyov, Kobelev (captain), Zharinov, Kutsenko (Kulyov, 61), Kulchiy, Nekrasov, Teryokhin.
 July 12, 1997 / Group 11, Day 4 / FC Lokomotiv Nizhny Novgorod – Antalyaspor 1-0 (Durnev ) / Nizhny Novgorod, Lokomotiv Stadium / Attendance: 10,000
FC Lokomotiv Nizhny Novgorod: Satsunkevich, Baltušnikas, Nizhegorodov, Kurayev (captain), Lipko, Ionanidze (Dzhubanov, 40), Bystrov, Zubkov, Rapeika, Durnev (Duyun, 65), Mukhamadiev (Kashentsev, 63).
 July 12, 1997 / Group 12, Day 4 / Floriana F.C. – FC Torpedo-Luzhniki Moscow 0-1 (Botsiyev ) / Valletta, Victor Tedesco Stadium / Attendance: 1,000
FC Torpedo-Luzhniki Moscow: Vorobyov, Makhmutov, Kornaukhov, Samaroni, Burchenkov (Agashkov, 90), Guzhov (Carlos Alberto, 33), Ražanauskas, Preikšaitis (Gashkin, 46), Koshelyuk, Botsiyev, Kamoltsev (captain).

 July 19, 1997 / Group 5, Day 5 / Stabæk – FC Dynamo Moscow 1–1 (Skistad  – Kosolapov ) / Bærum, Nadderud stadion / Attendance: 2,000
FC Dynamo Moscow: Tiapushkin, Korablyov, Kozlov, Tochilin, Povorov, Zharinov, Likhobabenko, Kulyov, Kutsenko (Gordeyev, 72), Gusev (Sherstnyov, 77), Kosolapov (Artyomov, 65).
 July 19, 1997 / Group 11, Day 5 / Maccabi Haifa F.C. – FC Lokomotiv Nizhny Novgorod 0-4 (Perednya  Mordvinov  Ionanidze  Mukhamadiev ) / Haifa, Kiryat Eliezer Stadium / Attendance: 200
FC Lokomotiv Nizhny Novgorod: Mikhailov, Zubkov, Oskolkov, Rapeika, Chudin, Kazakov (captain) (Ignatyev, 46), Kashentsev, Mordvinov (Mukhamadiev, 46), Dzhubanov, Perednya, Ionanidze.
 July 19, 1997 / Group 12, Day 5 / FC Torpedo-Luzhniki Moscow – SV Ried 2-0 (Carlos Alberto  Gashkin ) / Moscow, Torpedo Stadium / Attendance: 1,500
FC Torpedo-Luzhniki Moscow: Vorobyov, Arlowski (Alomerović, 32), Khokhlov, Mashkarin (captain), Burchenkov, Bushmanov, Preikšaitis, Kamoltsev, Gashkin (Botsiyev, 46), Koshelyuk, Carlos Alberto (Samaroni, 66).

 July 26, 1997 / Semi-finals, First leg / FC Dynamo Moscow – MSV Duisburg 2–2 (Teryokhin   – Osthoff  Salou ) / Moscow, Dynamo Stadium / Attendance: 5,000
FC Dynamo Moscow: Tiapushkin, Kutsenko (Kosolapov, 75), Kovtun, Ostrovskiy, Shtanyuk, Kobelev (captain), Zharinov (Tochilin, 66), Skokov, Kulchiy, Nekrasov, Teryokhin.
 July 26, 1997 / Semi-finals, First leg / FC Lokomotiv Nizhny Novgorod – Halmstads BK 0-0 / Nizhny Novgorod, Lokomotiv Stadium / Attendance: 6,900
FC Lokomotiv Nizhny Novgorod: Mikhailov, Baltušnikas, Oskolkov (Zubkov, 75), Duyun, Vlasov, Chudin, Dzhubanov, Kashentsev, Mordvinov, Perednya (Bystrov, 46), Ionanidze (Rapeika, 46).
 July 26, 1997 / Semi-finals, First leg / AJ Auxerre – FC Torpedo-Luzhniki Moscow 3-0 (Goma  Diomède  Marlet ) / Auxerre, Stade de l'Abbé-Deschamps / Attendance: 5,000
FC Torpedo-Luzhniki Moscow: Vorobyov, Arlowski (Burchenkov, 83), Khokhlov, Mashkarin (captain), Eguavoen, Alomerović, Kornaukhov, Kamoltsev (Carlos Alberto, 45), Botsiyev, Koshelyuk, Samaroni (Preikšaitis, 76).

 July 30, 1997 / Semi-finals, Return leg / MSV Duisburg – FC Dynamo Moscow 3–1 (Wohlert   Gill  – Kobelev  Kovtun  Teryokhin ) / Duisburg, Wedaustadion / Attendance: 8,650
FC Dynamo Moscow: Tiapushkin, Tochilin (Gusev, 56), Kovtun, Ostrovskiy, Shtanyuk, Kobelev (captain), Kutsenko (Kosolapov, 60), Skokov, Kulchiy, Nekrasov, Teryokhin.
 July 30, 1997 / Semi-finals, Return leg / Halmstads BK – FC Lokomotiv Nizhny Novgorod 1-0 (F. Andersson ) / Halmstad, Örjans Vall / Attendance: 2,329
FC Lokomotiv Nizhny Novgorod: Satsunkevich, Nizhegorodov, Chudin, Duyun, Lipko, Rapeika, Dzhubanov, Zubkov, Ionanidze, Perednya, Mukhamadiev.
 July 30, 1997 / Semi-finals, Return leg / FC Torpedo-Luzhniki Moscow – AJ Auxerre 4-1 (Gashkin  Mashkarin  Samaroni  Carlos Alberto  – Guivarc'h ) / Moscow, Eduard Streltsov Stadium / Attendance: 3,000
FC Torpedo-Luzhniki Moscow: Vorobyov, Arlowski, Khokhlov, Mashkarin (captain), Alomerović (Eguavoen, 71), Bushmanov, Preikšaitis (Botsiyev, 46), Kamoltsev (Carlos Alberto, 69), Gashkin, Koshelyuk, Samaroni.

National team
Russia national football team came second in their qualification group for the 1998 FIFA World Cup. They lost to Italy in the playoffs for the second-placed teams and did not qualify for the World Cup. Boris Ignatyev was the head coach, with Yuri Syomin assisting throughout and Leonid Pakhomov assisting from the third game on.

 February 7, 1997 / Carlsberg Cup / Yugoslavia – Russia 1-1 (Drobnjak  Kocić  – Popov ) / Hong Kong, Hong Kong Stadium / Attendance: 25,430
Russia: Ovchinnikov, Khlestov (Bokov, 78), Tsveiba, Chugainov, Popov, Kharlachyov, Veretennikov (Alenichev, 46), Yanovskiy, Tikhonov (captain), Simutenkov, Kanishchev (Kechinov, 88).

 February 10, 1997 / Carlsberg Cup / Switzerland – Russia 1-2 (Thüler  – Simutenkov  ) / Hong Kong, Hong Kong Stadium / Attendance: 20,167
Russia: Cherchesov (captain), Bokov, Chugainov, Tsveiba, Popov, Alenichev, Tsymbalar (Veretennikov, 88), Yanovskiy, Kharlachyov, Gerasimenko (Kanishchev, 77), Simutenkov.

 March 12, 1997 / Friendly / Yugoslavia – Russia 0-0 / Belgrade, Stadion Crvena Zvezda / Attendance: 32,000
Russia: Ovchinnikov, Khlestov, Chugainov, Popov (Kharlachyov, 64), Tetradze, Karpin, Onopko (captain), Kanchelskis (Alenichev, 74), Beschastnykh (Tsveiba, 46; Bokov, 85), Kolyvanov, Simutenkov (Gerasimenko, 86).

 March 29, 1997 / 1998 FIFA World Cup qualifier / Cyprus – Russia 1-1 (Gogić  – Simutenkov ) / Paralimni, Paralimni Stadium / Attendance: 3,199
Russia: Cherchesov, Popov, Chugainov, Tsymbalar (Gerasimenko, 69), Tetradze, Karpin, Onopko (captain), Kanchelskis, Mostovoi, Kolyvanov, Simutenkov.

 April 30, 1997 / 1998 FIFA World Cup qualifier / Russia – Luxembourg 3-0 (Kechinov  Grishin  Simutenkov  – Strasser ) / Moscow, Dynamo Stadium / Attendance: 10,000
Russia: Ovchinnikov, Radimov (Zubko, 68), Kovtun, Kosolapov, Tetradze (Popov, 26), Chugainov, Onopko (captain), Alenichev, Beschastnykh (Grishin, 46), Kechinov, Simutenkov.

 June 8, 1997 / 1998 FIFA World Cup qualifier / Russia – Israel 2-0 (Radimov  Kosolapov ) / Moscow, Dynamo Stadium / Attendance: 30,000
Russia: Ovchinnikov, Radimov, Nikiforov, Kosolapov, Yanovskiy, Tsveiba, Onopko (captain), Alenichev, Grishin (Yesipov, 90), Cheryshev (Kovtun, 83), Beschastnykh (Tikhonov, 61).

The next game was officially billed as "Russia All Stars vs. FIFA World XI" and does not count as an official Russian national football team game. It was held to commemorate 100 years anniversary of football in Russia and 850 years anniversary of the founding of Moscow. Uwe Gospodarek, who played in this game, never actually played a game for Germany national football team.

 August 18, 1997 / Friendly / Russia All Stars – FIFA World XI 0-2 (Djorkaeff  Guerrero ) / Moscow, Luzhniki Stadium / Attendance: 62,000
Referee: Pierluigi Collina.
Russia All Stars: Ovchinnikov (Cherchesov, 46), Kovtun (Pagayev, 46), Nikiforov (Chugainov, 46), Popov, Kosolapov (Yanovskiy, 46), Kanchelskis (Grishin, 46), Onopko (captain), Alenichev (Kharlachyov, 46), Kolyvanov (Tikhonov, 46), Veretennikov, Simutenkov (Cheryshev, 46).
FIFA World XI: Zubizarreta (Gospodarek, 46), Vega, Suárez, Verlaat, Matthäus  (captain), Djorkaeff (Tsveiba, 78), Guerrero, Winter, Papin (Abédi Pelé, 46), Effenberg, Shevchenko (Beschastnykh, 58).
FIFA World XI coaches: Bobby Robson and Bora Milutinović.

 August 20, 1997 / Friendly / Russia – Yugoslavia 0-1 (Beschastnykh  – Jokanović ) / St. Petersburg, Petrovsky Stadium / Attendance: 9,000
Russia: Cherchesov (Ovchinnikov, 46), Tsveiba, Nikiforov, Yanovskiy, Kosolapov (Tikhonov, 46), Kanchelskis (Beschastnykh, 46), Onopko (captain), Alenichev, Kolyvanov (Grishin, 62), Khlestov (Kovtun, 62), Cheryshev (Simutenkov, 46).

 September 10, 1997 / 1998 FIFA World Cup qualifier / Bulgaria – Russia 1-0 (Ivanov ) / Sofia, Vasil Levski National Stadium / Attendance: 55,000
Russia: Ovchinnikov, Kovtun, Nikiforov, Kosolapov (Khokhlov, 46), Yanovskiy, Tsveiba, Onopko (captain), Kanchelskis, Alenichev, Kolyvanov, Simutenkov (Cheryshev, 76).

 October 11, 1997 / 1998 FIFA World Cup qualifier / Russia – Bulgaria 4-2 (Alenichev   Kolyvanov  Yuran  – Gruev  Kostadinov ) / Moscow, Luzhniki Stadium / Attendance: 21,000
Russia: Ovchinnikov, Popov, Chugainov, Tsveiba, Yanovskiy, Tikhonov, Onopko (captain), Alenichev (Kosolapov, 82), Yuran (Veretennikov, 67), Kolyvanov, Simutenkov (Radimov, 46).

 October 29, 1997 / 1998 FIFA World Cup qualifier, play-off first leg / Russia – Italy 1-1 (Cannavaro  – Vieri ) / Moscow, Dynamo Stadium / Attendance: 20,000
Russia: Ovchinnikov, Radimov, Chugainov, Popov (Tikhonov, 78), Yanovskiy, Kovtun, Onopko (captain) (Tsveiba, 43), Alenichev, Yuran, Kolyvanov, Kanchelskis (Khokhlov, 46).

 November 15, 1997 / 1998 FIFA World Cup qualifier, play-off return leg / Italy – Russia / 1-0 (Casiraghi ) / Naples, Stadio San Paolo / Attendance: 76,500
Russia: Ovchinnikov, Kovtun, Nikiforov, Onopko (captain), Popov, Radimov (Semak, 66), Khokhlov, Yanovskiy (Simutenkov, 60), Alenichev, Yuran (Beschastnykh, 79), Kolyvanov.

See also

References

 
Seasons in Russian football

it:Top League 1997